The Hampton Pirates football team represents Hampton University in college football. The Pirates compete in the NCAA Division I Football Championship Subdivision (FCS) as a member of the Colonial Athletic Association (CAA).

History

Classifications
1950–1972: NCAA College Division
1973–1994: NCAA Division II
1995–present: NCAA Division I–AA/FCS

Conference memberships
1902–1911: Independent
1912–1994: Central Intercollegiate Athletic Association
1995–2017: Mid-Eastern Athletic Conference
2018: Independent
2019–2021: Big South Conference
2022-Present Colonial Athletic Association

Other
In 2022, Former Hampton Pirate defensive back, Destin Route, more well known as JID on-stage, was nominated for a Grammy for his rap album, “The Forever Story.”

Also in 2022, Pirates player Byron Perkins came out as gay, making him the first openly gay football player at any Historically Black College or University.

Championships

Black College National championships

Conference championships

Notable Alumni
Over 25 Hampton alumni have played or coached in the NFL, including:

Jamal Brooks
Chris Baker
Darian Barnes
Travis Coleman
Reggie Doss
Justin Durant
Kenrick Ellis
Kendall Langford
Jerome Mathis
Michael Ola
Lucien Reeberg
Carl Painter
Greg Scott
Zuriel Smith
Ricardo Silva
Derius Swinton II
Cordell Taylor
Terrence Warren
Marcus Dixon
Antico Dalton

Other notable alumni include Destin Route, also known as JID.

Playoff appearances

NCAA Division I–AA/FCS
The Pirates have appeared in the I-AA/FCS playoffs five times with an overall record of 0–5.

NCAA Division II
The Pirates appeared in the Division II playoffs three times with an overall record of 1–3.

Rivalries
 Battle of the Bay (Hampton–Norfolk State)
 The Real HU (Howard-Hampton)

References

External links
 

 
American football teams established in 1902
1902 establishments in Virginia